Broman is a surname. Notable people with the name include:

 Alby Broman (1917–1977), Australian rules footballer
 Arne Broman (1913–1995), Swedish mathematician working on analysis
 Bertel Broman (1889–1952), Finnish sailor
 Erland Broman (1704–1757), Swedish official and noble
 Johan Broman (1877–1953), Finnish lawyer and politician
 John Broman (born 1958), American ski jumper
 Susan Broman (born 1959), Finnish competitive figure skater
 Väinö Broman (born 1932), Finnish sports shooter

See also 
 4575 Broman, main-belt asteroid